The Jeselnik Offensive was an American late-night television series that aired on Comedy Central. It was hosted by stand-up comedian Anthony Jeselnik, who extended his onstage character into weekly, topical humor with a sociopathic, dark twist. The show primarily consisted of a monologue and two panelists who joined Jeselnik in adding a humorous take on shocking, lurid news stories. The series premiered February 19, 2013, on Comedy Central and was renewed for a second season on April 26, 2013, and aired July 9, 2013. On November 11, 2013, Comedy Central cancelled The Jeselnik Offensive after two seasons, due to low ratings.

Format
The Jeselnik Offensive has been described as combination of the late-night comedy series and a podcast. Each episode opens with a monologue from Jeselnik, which focuses on tragic news and dark humor. The following segment can sometimes be a comedic remote or an audience-participation game ("Which Kind of Asian Is This?"). Several recurring bits are used: "Sacred Cow" is a segment that takes a subject deemed off limits, and proceeds to make several jokes about it. Each segment uses its platform to tackle such "off-topic" topics as cancer, bullying and missing children through jokes. The following two segments feature guest panelists who continue the wicked take on news. The final segment, "Defend Your Tweet," in which Jeselnik digs up an old tweet by each of the panelists and confronts them with it. At the end of each show, Jeselnik looks back at faux "Best Moments" from the broadcast, and closes the show with his sign-off phrase, "Good night, kids, go read a book."

The series was live at Hollywood Center Studios in Los Angeles.

History
In preparing the show, Comedy Central was looking for a half-hour, four-nights-a-week show following The Colbert Report titled Midnight. Jeselnik's main draw was the monologue, where he felt he could tell jokes that he was unable to do on Late Night with Jimmy Fallon, where he worked in 2009. For the pilot, Jeselnik did a test interview with a celebrity but felt "so wrong [...] it just fit me like a bad suit." For the show's first episode, Jeselnik performs cancer-related standup for a cancer support group. "I had to fight with Comedy Central to put that on the first episode," said Jeselnik. The network felt uneasy using the sketch as an introduction. Jeselnik pointed to the premiere episode of Chappelle's Show, in which Dave Chappelle plays a blind African-American Klansman, which he regarded as "one of the edgiest things they ever did." As such, the sketch opened the first episode and received a positive reception; Jay Leno called to inform Jeselnik how much he loved the cancer segment. Season 2 premiered July 9.

Jeselnik revealed in his Netflix Special "Thoughts and Prayers" that Comedy Central threatened to cancel the show after Jeselnik made a joke about the Boston Marathon bombing the day it happened on his Twitter account. After Jeselnik told Comedy Central he would not delete it (once they threatened to fire only him), they then informed him that they would simply cancel the show and fire everyone who worked on the show to which Jeselnik then deleted the joke citing "what I could not do, what I cannot do, is walk up to my cameraman and say, 'Hey, buddy, no work for you on Monday; I had this sweet Tweet.'"

Episodes

Season 1 (2013)

Season 2 (2013)

Reception
The series received positive reviews. Kevin McFarland of The A.V. Club wrote, "The Jeselnik Offensive is one of the best [Comedy Central shows]. It's a highly intriguing and reliably funny take on the late-night format," adding, "Jeselnik and his writers prove that the key to making jokes about touchy subjects is actually being funny instead of simply trying to be edgy."

See also
List of programs broadcast by Comedy Central

References

External links
 The Jeselnik Offensive

2010s American black comedy television series
2010s American late-night television series
2013 American television series debuts
2013 American television series endings
English-language television shows
Comedy Central original programming